Edgetts Landing is an unincorporated community in Albert County, New Brunswick. The community is situated in Southeastern New Brunswick, to the south of Moncton.

History

Notable people

See also
List of communities in New Brunswick

Bordering communities

References

Communities in Albert County, New Brunswick